The 2013 MTV Movie Awards were held on April 14, 2013 at Sony Pictures Studios in Culver City, California. The show was hosted by Rebel Wilson. The nominees were announced on March 5.

Performers
 Rebel Wilson, Skylar Astin, Anna Camp, Esther Dean, Adam DeVine, Alexis Knapp, Hana Mae Lee, Ben Platt, Utkarsh Ambudkar, and Brittany Snow – "The Climb / Lose Yourself / Thrift Shop / Girl on Fire"
 Macklemore and Ryan Lewis featuring Ray Dalton – "Can't Hold Us"
 Selena Gomez – "Come & Get It"

Presenters
 Melissa McCarthy – presented Best Male Performance
 Adam Sandler and Chris Rock – presented Best WTF Moment
 Chris Pine, Zachary Quinto, and Zoe Saldana – presented Best Fight
 Eddie Redmayne, Logan Lerman, and Jonah Hill – presented Trailblazer Award
 Steve Carell and Amanda Seyfried – presented Best Kiss
 Snoop Dogg and Kesha – introduced Macklemore and Ryan Lewis
 Peter Dinklage – presented Comedic Genius Award
 Paul Walker, Vin Diesel, Jordana Brewster, and Michelle Rodriguez – presented Best Breakthrough Performance
 Zac Efron, Danny McBride, and Seth Rogen – presented Best Shirtless Performance
 Quvenzhané Wallis and Chloë Grace Moretz – presented Best Villain
 Kim Kardashian – introduced Selena Gomez
 Kerry Washington – presented MTV Generation Award
 Liam Hemsworth – presented the teaser for The Hunger Games: Catching Fire
 Ashley Rickards and Tyler Posey – presented Best Musical Moment
 Brad Pitt – presented Movie of the Year

Films with multiple nominations
 Seven - The Dark Knight Rises, Silver Linings Playbook, Ted, and Django Unchained
 Six - The Avengers
 Five - Skyfall
 Four - Pitch Perfect and The Perks of Being a Wallflower
 Three - Les Misérables and Magic Mike
 Two - The Hobbit: An Unexpected Journey, Life of Pi, and Savages

Films with multiple awards
 Three - The Avengers and Silver Linings Playbook
 Two - Pitch Perfect

Awards

Comedic Genius Award
 Will Ferrell

MTV Trailblazer Award
 Emma Watson

MTV Generation Award
 Jamie Foxx

Sneak peeks
 Liam Hemsworth presented a teaser trailer for The Hunger Games: Catching Fire.
 Sneak peeks for Star Trek Into Darkness, Fast & Furious 6, and World War Z were shown.
 An Iron Man 3 extended clip was shown during commercial.

References

External links
 MTV Movie Awards official site
 2013 MTV Movie Awards at IMDb

MTV Movie & TV Awards
MTV Movie Awards
MTV Movie
2013 in Los Angeles
2013 in American cinema